Mohammed Hosein (born 4 March 1938) is a former West Indian cricket umpire. He stood in two ODI games between 1988 and 1989.

See also
 List of One Day International cricket umpires

References

1938 births
Living people
West Indian One Day International cricket umpires